St. Peters College Tororo (SPCT), also known as Tororo College, is an all-boys boarding school covering grades 8 -13 in Eastern Uganda.

Location
The coordinates of the school campus are:
0° 42' 18.00"N, 34° 12' 0.00"E (Latitude:0.7050; Longitude:34.2000).

Notable alumni
Notable people who  have attended Tororo College include:
 Charles Olweny - Physician. oncologist, medical researcher and academic. Current Professor of Medicine and Former Vice Chancellor of Uganda Martyrs University (2006 - 2015).
 Okello Oculi - Author, poet and novelist.
 Opiyo Oloya - Educator, author, newspaper columnist and community leader. Current Superintendent of Schools, York Catholic District School Board, Ontario, Canada.
 Raphael Owor - Physician, pathologist, academic, researcher, and academic administrator, former Chancellor of Mbarara University, past Dean of Makerere University School of Medicine and Head of Pathology Department at Makerere University
 Wilbrod Humphreys Owor - businessman, bank executive, and management consultant 
 Emmanuel Blayo Wakhweya - Idi Amin's Finance Minister; longest serving member of his cabinet
 Amos Wekesa - businessman, entrepreneur and corporate executive
 Sam Kiwanuka - senior military officer in the Uganda People's Defence Forces
 Richard Musani -  chartered marketing executive, SME consultant, automotive expert and business columnist
 Vinand Nantulya - physician, pathologist, medical researcher, entrepreneur and academic administrator

See also
Education in Uganda
List of schools in Uganda

References

External links
Location of St. Peters College Tororo At Google Maps
St. Peters College Tororo Gets New Science Laboratory
Tororo College Gets New Dormitory

Boarding schools in Uganda
Educational institutions established in 1950
Boys' schools in Uganda
Tororo District
1950 establishments in Uganda
Schools in Uganda